Clyde is an unincorporated area in Indiana County, in the U.S. state of Pennsylvania.

History
A post office called Clyde was established in 1882, and remained in operation until 1955. The origin of the name Clyde is obscure; it may be named after the River Clyde in Scotland.

References

Unincorporated communities in Indiana County, Pennsylvania
Unincorporated communities in Pennsylvania